Violence & Force is the second studio album by the Canadian speed metal band Exciter, released through Megaforce Records in February 1984. The album was produced by The Rods drummer Carl Canedy, who had already produced Anthrax's debut album Fistful of Metal.

The album was reissued in 1999 by SPV/Steamhammer with the same track listing and again in 2004 by Megaforce, without the song "Evil Sinner".

Track listing

Personnel

Exciter 
 Dan Beehler − vocals, drums
 John Ricci − guitar, backing vocals
 Allan Johnson – bass, backing vocals

Production 
Carl Canedy – producer
Exciter – arrangements
Chris Bubacz – engineer
Alex Perialas – assistant engineer
Jack Skinner – mastering at Sterling Sound, New York
Jon Zazula – executive producer
Andy Brown – artwork

References 

1984 albums
Exciter (band) albums
Megaforce Records albums